The Wyoming United States House election for 1892 was held on November 3, 1892. Democratic Henry A. Coffeen defeated Republican incumbent Clarence D. Clark with 51.34% of the vote making Clark the first incumbent Representative from Wyoming to lose reelection.

Results

References

Wyoming
1892
1892 Wyoming elections